Ensio Hyytiä (24 March 1938 – 24 March 2019) was a Finnish ski jumper who competed in the late 1950s and early 1960s. He won the ski jumping silver medal at the 1958 FIS Nordic World Ski Championships in Lahti. He was born in Rovaniemi. He also competed at the 1960 Winter Olympics and the 1964 Winter Olympics.

References

External links

Ensio Hyytiä's obituary 

1938 births
2019 deaths
People from Rovaniemi
Finnish male ski jumpers
Finnish male Nordic combined skiers
Olympic ski jumpers of Finland
Olympic Nordic combined skiers of Finland
Nordic combined skiers at the 1960 Winter Olympics
Ski jumpers at the 1964 Winter Olympics
FIS Nordic World Ski Championships medalists in ski jumping
Sportspeople from Lapland (Finland)
20th-century Finnish people